Derekışla can refer to:

 Derekışla, Bala
 Derekışla, Sungurlu